Cnesia is a genus of 4 species of black flies. They are distributed in Argentina and Chile.

Species
C. dissimilis (Edwards, 1931)
C. gynandrum (Edwards, 1931)
C. ornata Wygodzinsky & Coscarón, 1973 
C. pusilla Wygodzinsky & Coscarón, 1973

Literature cited

Simuliidae
Culicomorpha genera
Fauna of Chile
Fauna of Argentina
Insects of South America